A Space to Grow is a 1968 American short documentary film produced by Thomas P. Kelly Jr. about Upward Bound programs in Chicago. It was nominated for an Academy Award for Best Documentary Short.

See also
List of American films of 1968

References

External links

Watch A Space to Grow at the Chicago Film Archives
A Space to Grow at the National Archives and Records Administration

1968 films
1968 short films
1968 documentary films
American short documentary films
1960s short documentary films
Documentary films about education in the United States
Documentary films about Chicago
1960s English-language films
1960s American films